DSCI may refer to:

 DSCI Corp., a United States telephone company
 Drought Severity and Coverage Index - an alternative to the Palmer drought index used by organisations including the United States Drought Monitor
 Data Security Council of India

See also
 Defence School of Communications and Information Systems (DSCIS)